Chloe Rose Lewis (born June 18, 2000) is an American former ice dancer. With partner Logan Bye, she is the 2016 Youth Olympic silver medalist.

Personal life 
Chloe Rose Lewis was born on June 18, 2000 in Portland, Oregon. She has two older brothers and cat. She attended the Catlin Gabel School in Portland, Oregon, where she lived before her move to Novi, Michigan around 2014. She currently a freshman in college.

Career 
Lewis started learning to skate in 2004. At age seven, she began taking ice dancing lessons, instructed by Judy Blumberg.

Intermediate and novice career 
Lewis and Logan Bye met in February 2010 at a rink in Sun Valley, Idaho and began training together in August 2010. Because they lived in different cities, they trained half a month together, half apart during their first two seasons. In the 2010–11 season, they qualified to compete on the intermediate level at the U.S. Junior Championships and finished sixth.

Lewis/Bye placed fourth on the novice level at the 2012 U.S. Championships. They began training together regularly after Bye moved to Beaverton, Oregon in autumn 2012.  They won the novice title at the 2013 U.S. Championships.

Junior career 
During the 2013–14 season, Lewis/Bye were coached by Ikaika Young in Portland, Oregon; by Judy Blumberg in Sun Valley, Idaho; and by Igor Shpilband in Novi, Michigan. Making their ISU Junior Grand Prix (JGP) debut, they placed fifth in September 2013 in Mexico City, Mexico, and 11th the following month in Ostrava, Czech Republic. The two finished sixth on the junior level at the 2014 U.S. Championships.

In 2014–15, Lewis/Bye were coached by Shpilband and Blumberg in Novi, Michigan. They placed fifth in Courchevel, France at their sole 2015 JGP assignment and seventh in junior ice dancing at the 2015 U.S. Championships.

Coached by Shpilband, Lewis/Bye placed fifth at both of their 2015–16 JGP assignments. In January 2016, they finished 6th on the junior level at the 2016 U.S. Championships. In February, they represented the United States at the 2016 Youth Olympics in Hamar, Norway. Ranked third in the short dance and second in the free dance, they were awarded the silver medal behind Anastasia Shpilevaya / Grigory Smirnov and ahead of Anastasia Skoptsova / Kirill Aleshin.

Programs 
(with Bye)

Competitive highlights 
JGP: Junior Grand Prix

With Bye

References

External links 
 

2000 births
American female ice dancers
Living people
Sportspeople from Portland, Oregon
Figure skaters at the 2016 Winter Youth Olympics
Youth Olympic silver medalists for the United States
21st-century American women